The 1984 Sonoma State Cossacks football team represented Sonoma State University as a member of the Northern California Athletic Conference (NCAC) during the 1984 NCAA Division II football season. Led by third-year head coach Tony Kehl, Sonoma State finished the season with an overall record of 1–9 and a mark of 1–5 in conference play, placing sixth in the NCAC. The team was outscored by its opponents 288 to 126 for the season. The Cossacks played home games at Cossacks Stadium in Rohnert Park, California.

On January 1, 1985, the NCAC announced it had ruled that San Francisco State had used two ineligible players and must forfeit three victories, including one conference win over Sonoma State. With the forfeit win, the Cossacks' record improved to 2–8 overall and 2–4 in conference play, elevating them to fifth place in the NCAC.

Schedule

Notes

References

Sonoma State
Sonoma State Cossacks football seasons
Sonoma State Cossacks football